LVV may refer to:

Lëvizja Vetëvendosje
Literal music video (Literal video version)
Loving v. Virginia